Ricardo Mario Darín (born 14 January 1989), known professionally as Chino Darín, is an Argentine actor and film producer.

Early life
Ricardo Mario Darín was born on 14 January 1989 in San Nicolás de los Arroyos, Buenos Aires Province, to actor Ricardo Darín and Florencia Bas.

Personal life
In June 2016, he announced that he was in a relationship with Spanish actress Úrsula Corberó, whom he met on the set of the TV show La embajada.

Filmography

Film

Television

Host

Theater

Awards and nominations

References

External links

 
 

1989 births
Argentine film producers
Argentine male film actors
Argentine male stage actors
Argentine male television actors
Argentine television presenters
Living people
People from San Nicolás de los Arroyos